The 1893 Prince Edward Island general election was held in the Canadian Province of Prince Edward Island on 13 December 1893. This was the first general election of Prince Edward Island won by the Liberal Party.

Each district elected two members. One of the two members from each constituency is styled a Councillor, and the other an Assemblyman. Assemblymen were elected by all resident males over the age of 21. Councillors were elected by property-owners.

In electoral contests Councillor candidates run against Councillor candidates; Assemblyman candidates against Assemblyman candidates.

References

1893 elections in Canada
Elections in Prince Edward Island
1893 in Prince Edward Island
December 1893 events